Terry Fossum is an American businessperson and philanthropist. He is best known as the winner of the Fox reality television series Kicking and Screaming.

Early life
Terry L. Fossum was born in Mission, Texas but raised in McAllen, Texas as one of three brothers, during which time he joined the Boy Scouts of America, where he became an Eagle Scout. He earned a degree in mechanical engineering from Texas A&M University while serving in the Corps of Cadets, following which Fossum became an officer in the U.S. Air Force.  He became the Officer of the Year for the Fairchild Air Force Base and was the Executive Officer for a Group of Nuclear B-52 Bombers.

Career
After the Air Force Fossum founded a direct sales company, and became a travelling public speaker.  He also founded the Terry L. Fossum Learning Center in Rwanda, the Terry L. Fossum Scholarships for Underprivileged Youth in McAllen, and providing agricultural training for Malawi, Africa. He has been named the Strategic Air Command Humanitarian of the Year. In 2021 he published the book The Oxcart Technique: Blueprint for Success, which reached number one on the best seller list of the Wall Street Journal, Amazon, Barnes & Noble, and USA Today.

Television
In 2017 Fossum appeared on the Fox reality television series Kicking and Screaming, a show that paired survival experts with “wilderness impaired partners”. He and his partner Natalie Casanova won the competition, splitting the $500,000 grand prize. This then led to several million dollars in donations for the Scouts following the series airing. Fossum was also the producer for the film Tiger Lily Is My Little Sister, in which he also acted, and the film Role Prey. Both films centered on the problem of human trafficking. He received the Best Supporting Actor and Fan Favorite award at the Christian Film Festival in 2021 for his role in the movie Agape.

Volunteering
Fossum has continued to be involved in the Boy Scouts of America, first as a scoutmaster, and eventually as the vice president for programs for the Washington State's Inland Northwest Council, as a resident of Spokane Valley, Washington.

References

Living people
Texas A&M University alumni
Participants in American reality television series
People from Mission, Texas
American philanthropists
American business writers
United States Air Force officers
Film producers from Texas
Male actors from Texas
Year of birth missing (living people)
Reality show winners
Military personnel from Texas